Anton Schall (22 June 1907 – 5 August 1947) was an Austrian football forward who played for the celebrated Austrian national side of the early 1930s that became known as the Wunderteam. He also played for Admira Vienna, and later managed FC Basel. Normally a versatile left footed forward or winger, Schall is considered one of the greatest Austrian footballers. A pacy, skillful forward, Schall possessed fine finishing and great attacking intelligence. Later in his career Schall played as a defender.

His success with the national team included making Runner-up at the 1927-30 Central European International Cup, Winner at the 1931-32 Central European International Cup being top scorer for Austria & reaching the semifinals at the 1934 FIFA World Cup.

After his playing career, Schall, who suffered from a rare heart condition, moved to Switzerland and took over Basel as club trainer in the 1946–47 season. Schall led Basel to win the Swiss Cup, 3–0 in the final against Lausanne Sports. However, he died shortly afterwards aged 40 during a workout on the football field. Team captain Ernst Hufschmid then took Basel over as coach.

Career statistics

International 
Austria
 Central European International Cup: 1931-32
 Central European International Cup: Runner-up: 1927-30
 FIFA World Cup: Semifinals - fourth place: 1934

International goals

Austria's goal tally first

References

1907 births
1947 deaths
Footballers from Vienna
Austrian footballers
Austria international footballers
Association football forwards
FC Admira Wacker Mödling players
Austrian football managers
FC Basel managers
1934 FIFA World Cup players
Sport deaths in Switzerland
Association football players who died while playing